Abkhvareh (also Romanized as Ābkhvāreh and Āb Khvāreh; also known as Abkhāra, Ābkhāreh, Avkhara, and Avkhāreh) is a village in Sina Rural District, in the Central District of Varzaqan County, East Azerbaijan Province, Iran. At the 2006 census, its population was 207, in 50 families.

References 

Towns and villages in Varzaqan County